Catholic Apostolic Church or Apostolic Catholic Church may refer to:

Apostolic Catholic Church (Philippines), an Independent Catholic denomination established in 1992
Catholic Apostolic Church, the movement associated with Edward Irving
Our Saviour New York, a church of the Catholic Apostolic Church which is also called as such
Catholicate of the West, also called Catholic Apostolic Church and Catholic Apostolic Church (Catholicate of the West)
Argentine Catholic Apostolic Church, an organisation founded in 1971
Brazilian Catholic Apostolic Church, an organisation founded in 1945
Mexican Catholic Apostolic Church, an organisation founded in 1925
 Irish Orthodox Catholic and Apostolic Church, founded by the independent bishop Michael Cox
Catholic Apostolic Church of Antioch, founded in 1958
Catholic Apostolic Charismatic Church of Jesus the King
Venezuelan Catholic Apostolic Church

See also

List of independent Catholic denominations
Apostolic Catholic Church (Philippines)

 Apostolic Church (disambiguation)
 Catholic Church (disambiguation)
 Apostolic (disambiguation)
 Catholic (disambiguation)